The Carnival Girl is a 1926 American silent drama film directed by Cullen Tate and starring Marion Mack, Gladys Brockwell and Frankie Darro.

Cast
 Marion Mack as Nanette 
 Gladys Brockwell as Her Mother 
 Frankie Darro as Her Brother 
 George Siegmann as Sigmund 
 Allan Forrest as Lieutenant Allan Dale 
 Jack Cooper as Gunner Sergeant Riley 
 Victor Potel as Slim 
 Max Asher as The Barker

References

Bibliography
 Munden, Kenneth White. The American Film Institute Catalog of Motion Pictures Produced in the United States, Part 1. University of California Press, 1997.

External links

1926 films
1926 drama films
American black-and-white films
Silent American drama films
American silent feature films
1920s English-language films
Films about the United States Coast Guard
Films directed by Cullen Tate
Associated Exhibitors films
1920s American films
Silent adventure films